Verkh-Muta (Motı-Bajı) is a rural locality (a selo) in Ust-Kansky District, the Altai Republic, Russia. The population was 108 as of 2016. There are 2 streets.

Geography 
Verkh-Muta is located 49 km north of Ust-Kan (the district's administrative centre) by road. Ust-Muta is the nearest rural locality.

References 

Rural localities in Ust-Kansky District